Eight ships of the United States Navy have been named USS Hornet, after the stinging insect:
 , a 10-gun sloop commissioned in 1775, served in the American Revolutionary War.
 , also a 10-gun sloop, took part in the First Barbary War.
 , a brig-rigged sloop-of-war, was launched on 28 July 1805 and sank in a storm on 29 September 1829.
  was a five-gun schooner used as a dispatch vessel between 1814 and 1820.
 , the first to be steam propelled, was an iron, side-wheeled steamer.
 , a converted yacht, was a dispatch vessel in the Spanish–American War.
  launched the Doolittle Raid in 1942, fought at the Battle of Midway, and was sunk at the Battle of the Santa Cruz Islands on 26 October 1942.
  was originally named Kearsarge, but renamed in honor of CV-8 and active through the rest of World War II; she is preserved as a museum ship in Alameda, California.

United States Navy ship names